Biplobi Bangla Congress (English: Revolutionary Bengal Congress; 
 BBC) is a political party in West Bengal, India. The party emerged as a splinter group of Bangla Congress ahead of the 1971 elections of West Bengal. This political Party was founded by Late Sukumar Roy, a prominent Congress leader of Bengal. BBC is now the part of the Left Front.

History 
Formation of BBC by the late Sukumar Roy is an important part in the history of Politics of West Bengal. Congress party hold the power of state for the first two decades after partition, before trying out another grouping in 1967. At that time, the first United Front government came to power with Ajoy Mukherjee of the Bangla Congress (a Congress splinter group) as chief minister, Jyoti Basu as deputy chief minister and ministry of land and land revenue (reforms) as Hare Krishna Konar. Thereafter followed four years of political instability due to the Naxalite rebellion and police counter-action, the Congress muscled its way back to power in the  1972 elections, when even Jyoti Basu lost his assembly seat to a nonentity by 40,000 votes. In 1977, the voters brought the Biplobi Bangla Congress and Left Front merged to power, with latter retaining the title and from since then they remained firm as the ruling party of West Bengal for 34 years. 

Some Prominent leaders of Biplobi Bangla Congress are Late Nirmalendu Bhattacharya, Late Gouranga Samanta, Ashis Chowdhury, Late Sunil Chowdhury, Deepak Senroy (SUBRATA ROY). 

Late Gouranga Samanta was  elected  as MLA two times from Dabang, Medinipur. Other MLAs were Dr Makhan Lal Bangal, Tushar Laya. 

Dr. Umesh Chaudhary & Reeta Chowdhury were Councillor in KMC (Kolkata Municipal Corporation) in different times.

The flag adopted by the party is red & white (3:1 ratio) with Hammer & Plough symbol at the center.

Contested elections 
BBC candidate Tushar Kanti Laya contested the Sabong seat in Midnapore for 2001 assembly elections of the state and won it. In the 2006 assembly elections of West Bengal, BBC again contested the Sabong seat with Tushar Kanti Laya as its candidate (on a Communist Party of India (Marxist) symbol). Laya got 62,079 votes (44.98%), but lost the seat to  Congress candidate Dr. Manas Bhunia.

References

Political parties in West Bengal
1971 establishments in West Bengal
Political parties established in 1971
Indian National Congress breakaway groups